Cypress-Medicine Hat is a provincial electoral district in the southeast corner of Alberta.

Under the Alberta electoral boundary re-distribution of 2004, the constituency covers the portion of Medicine Hat south of the South Saskatchewan River, the Trans-Canada Highway and Carry Drive. The rest of the city is part of the Medicine Hat constituency, which Cypress-Medicine Hat surrounds. The constituency borders Saskatchewan to the east and Montana to the south. Clockwise from the Montana border, the district also borders Cardston-Taber-Warner, Little Bow, Strathmore-Brooks and Drumheller-Stettler. Other major towns include Bow Island and Redcliff. The constituency represents Cypress County and the County of Forty Mile No. 8.

The MLA for this district is the United Conservative Party's Drew Barnes. He was first elected in 2012 as a Wildrose Party candidate in the 28th Alberta general election.

History
The electoral district was created in the 1993 boundary redistribution from the old electoral district of Cypress-Redcliff.

The 2010 boundary redistribution saw only minor changes made in the middle of the riding to align with changes to the Medicine Hat city limits.

Boundary history

Representation history

The electoral district was created in the boundary redistribution of 1993 from the old Cypress-Redcliff riding. The biggest change was the inclusion of parts of Medicine Hat that resulted in the name change.

The first election in the district held in 1993 was won by Progressive Conservative candidate Lorne Taylor who won with a comfortable margin defeating three other candidates.  He won his second term with a stronger majority in 1997. Premier Ralph Klein promoted him to the cabinet and held a few portfolio's after that election. He won a third term in 2001 before retiring in 2004.

The second member for the district was Leonard Mitzel who was elected to his first term in the 2004 election. He was re-elected in 2008 with a landslide.

In the 2012 Alberta general election Wildrose candidate Drew Barnes defeated Progressive Conservative incumbent Leonard Mitzel. Barnes captured 53.6 per cent of the vote. Barnes was subsequently reelected in 2015 capturing 54.5 per cent of the vote. In 2017 the Barnes became a member of the United Conservative Party when the Wildrose Party merged with the Progressive Conservative Association of Alberta. Barnes was subsequently reelected in 2019, capturing 67.1 per cent of the popular vote. On May 13, 2021, Barnes and Central Peace-Notley MLA Todd Loewen were expelled from the United Conservative caucus to sit as an independents.

Legislature results

1993 general election

1997 general election

2001 general election

2004 general election

2008 general election

2012 general election

2015 general election

2019 general election

Senate nominee election

2004 Senate nominee election district results

Voters had the option of selecting 4 Candidates on the Ballot

Student Vote results

2004 election

On November 19, 2004 a Student Vote was conducted at participating Alberta schools to parallel the 2004 Alberta general election results. The vote was designed to educate students and simulate the electoral process for persons who have not yet reached the legal majority. The vote was conducted in 80 of the 83 provincial electoral districts with students voting for actual election candidates. Schools with a large student body that reside in another electoral district had the option to vote for candidates outside of the electoral district then where they were physically located.

References

External links
Website of the Legislative Assembly of Alberta

Alberta provincial electoral districts
Politics of Medicine Hat